Heliophobia refers to light sensitivity:
 In psychology, heliophobia is the morbid fear of sunlight
 In medicine it can refer to:
 Hemeralopia, day blindness, inability to see clearly in bright light
 Photophobia, an excessive sensitivity of the eyes to sunlight. Notable causes include:
 Keratoconus, results in extreme optic sensitivity to sunlight and bright lights
 In biology, heliophobic plants or animals have an aversion to sunlight. Heliophobous plants are commonly known as "shade-tolerant".

See also
 Helium, a chemical element; other elements can be heliophilic, attracted to helium, or heliophobic, repelled by helium
 Phototropism, growth towards or away from light, particularly in plants and fungi
 Phytophotodermatitis, a potentially serious skin inflammation resulting from contact with a plant-based photosensitizing substance followed by exposure to ultraviolet light
 Porphyria cutanea tarda, a disease that causes the skin to be overly sensitive to sunlight to the point of causing blisters